The British Flyweight Championship is a British flyweight professional wrestling championship currently defended in XWA. It was created in the Frontier Wrestling Alliance (FWA), a promotion that was closed in 2007. In 2009, FWA announced plans to reopen and initiate a Flyweight Championship tour; it is unknown how this will affect the status of the current British Flyweight Championship.

History

The championship was originally created and defended in the Frontier Wrestling Alliance in 2005 as a title belt for the lighter wrestlers who did not qualify for the British Heavyweight Championship; though flyweight is often defined by a 123 lb or 112 lb weight limit in mixed martial arts and boxing, respectively, no strict weight limits are enforced for this belt. The inaugural champion was decided by an eight-man elimination tournament, the brackets for which were:

Ross Jordan was awarded the final match against Spud after the referee stopped the contest due to an injury to Spud's leg. This controversial ending would see Jordan crowned the first FWA Flyweight Champion.

Title History

Combined reigns

See also

Professional wrestling in the United Kingdom

References

Frontier Wrestling Alliance championships
Flyweight wrestling championships
2005 establishments in the United Kingdom
Recurring sporting events established in 2005
Professional wrestling in the United Kingdom
National championships in the United Kingdom
National professional wrestling championships
XWA (professional wrestling)